John Michel Mirona (جون ميشيل ميرونا; born 1962) is a former Olympic boxer from Sudan.

Boxing career

He competed for Sudan at the 1988 Summer Olympics in Seoul, South Korea in boxing.  In Men's Featherweight he came in tied for 17th. 

He received a bye in the first round, and was defeated by Ya'acov Shmuel of Israel in the second round. Shmuel knocked out Mirona in their 125.5-lb bout at 1:15 of the first round.

References 

Living people
1962 births
Featherweight boxers
Sudanese male boxers
Olympic boxers of Sudan
Boxers at the 1988 Summer Olympics